Richeza of Denmark (Swedish: Rikissa Valdemarsdotter; ? –8 May 1220) was Queen of Sweden as the wife of King Eric X, and the mother of King Eric XI.

Early life

Richeza was a daughter of Valdemar I of Denmark and Sophia of Minsk. She received her first name, originally a Lotharingian-Burgundian female name, in honor of her maternal grandmother, the late Richeza of Poland. In c. 1210 the new king Eric X of Sweden, who had deposed his predecessor Sverker II, desired to build cordial and peaceful relations with Denmark, which had traditionally supported the House of Sverker, against the Norwegian-supported dynasty of Eric. That was why Richeza, sister of the then reigning Valdemar II of Denmark, was married to Eric.

Queenship
When she arrived at the Swedish coast, according to a later folk song, she expressed her surprise that she was expected to ride and not travel by carriage, as she had been used to in her birth country, and the Swedish noblewomen and ladies-in-waiting had encouraged her to adapt the customs of her new home country instead of trying to establish her own "Jutian" customs.

Queen Richeza bore exclusively daughters as long as her spouse was alive. King Eric died in 1216. Dowager Queen Richeza was pregnant at the time and then gave birth to her only surviving son, the future Eric XI of Sweden, after the death of her spouse. The family of King Eric X, however, was driven to exile from Sweden as the House of Sverker heir, John I, was elected king there, to succeed Richeza's husband. It was in Denmark that Richeza herself died, without seeing her son's accession to the throne (in 1222), nor her daughters' marriages. She was buried in Ringsted. While nothing is concretely known about her person, the occurrence of the name Rikissa (Richeza) among her descendants may indicate that she was well-liked.

Children
Sophia Eriksdotter (died 1241), married Henry III of Rostock
(allegedly) Martha Eriksdotter married the Marshal Nils Sixtensson (Sparre)
Ingeborg Eriksdotter (died 1254), married to Birger Jarl, regent of Sweden
(possibly) Marianna Eriksdotter, who married a duke of Pomerania
Eric XI of Sweden (1216–1250)

References

Further reading
 Åke Ohlmarks: Alla Sveriges drottningar (All the queens of Sweden). Stockholm: Gebers, 1973.

|-

12th-century Swedish women
House of Estridsen
Burials at St. Bendt's Church, Ringsted
1180s births
1220 deaths
Danish princesses
Richeza 1210
House of Eric
Danish people of German descent
Danish people of Polish descent
Danish people of Russian descent
Danish people of English descent
13th-century Danish people
13th-century Swedish people
13th-century Danish women
13th-century Swedish women
12th-century Danish women
Daughters of kings